Americans for Middle East Understanding (AMEU) is a non-profit non-governmental organization that promotes the appreciation of the culture, history and current events in the Middle East among Americans. According to Elizabeth Boosahda, the AMEU "fosters increased understanding in America of the history, goals and values of all the peoples in the Middle-East and broader understanding of their religious beliefs, economic conditions and social customs." AMEU was established in 1967 by a number of American professionals who had experience of the Middle East, and who believe that Americans were receiving biased information about the region.  AMEU publishes a 16-page magazine called The Link on a bi-monthly basis, which is now in its 33rd year of publication. It also publishes leaflets about the Middle East, supports educational programs, sells books, donates to libraries, provides a speakers' bureau, subsidizes travel to the Middle East and provides teachers with educational material.

Board of directors

The board of directors includes scholars, academics, diplomats, authors, editors, religious representatives and business people including many with direct experience in the Middle East. Talcot Seelye, former American ambassador to Syria and Tunisia, served on the board of directors. AMEU's current board of directors includes former American ambassador to Greece, Zimbabwe, and Mauritius, Robert V. Keeley and former representative Paul Findley.

Palestinian advocacy

A 2004 article by Chana Shavelson on the pro-Israeli media watchdog, Committee for Accuracy in Middle East Reporting in America (CAMERA), AMEU is referred to as a "pro-Palestinian group."  Neoconservative Laurent Murawiec,  in his book, Prince of darkness: the Saudi assault on the West  says: "Americans for Middle East Understanding, established in 1969, evolved into a major organization within the Arab lobby."

References

External links
 Official website

Organizations established in 1967
Foreign policy political advocacy groups in the United States
Non-governmental organizations involved in the Israeli–Palestinian conflict
Middle Eastern American culture